Giler is a surname. Notable people with the surname include:

David Giler (1943–2020), American filmmaker
Franjo Giler (1907–1943), Yugoslav footballer

See also
Giles (surname)
Gilet (name)